Tansri Ubaidulla Matriculation Higher Secondary School is the first matriculation school started in the village Rajaghiri, Tamil Nadu, India.
It was first started by welfare trust to give a quality education to that village student.

References

High schools and secondary schools in Tamil Nadu
Education in Thanjavur district
Educational institutions in India with year of establishment missing